The Suogang Fishing Port is a fishing port in Suogang Village, Magong City, Penghu County, Taiwan.

History
The port was constructed in May 1953.

Architecture
The port wharf spans over a length of 240 meters. It is protected by a 127 meters long seawall. In 1977, the berthing area dredging works were completed. The port features gas station, ice storage, fishing gear preparation area and auction area. There is also a fish market at the port.

Economy
The port is the main distribution center for fish.

See also
 Port of Taichung

References

1953 establishments in Taiwan
Ports and harbors of Penghu County
Transport infrastructure completed in 1953